Christianity has a long history in the region that is now Sudan and South Sudan.
Ancient Nubia was reached by Coptic Christianity by the 2nd century.
The Coptic Church was later influenced by Greek Christianity, particularly during the Byzantine era. From the 7th century, the Christian Nubian kingdoms were threatened by the Islamic expansion, but the southernmost of these kingdoms, Alodia, survived until 1504.

Southern Sudan (including what is now South Sudan) remained long dominated by traditional (tribal) religions of the Nilotic peoples, with significant conversion to Christianity during the 20th and 21st centuries.

History

Coptic Christianity

Christianity reached the area of present-day northern Sudan, then called Nubia, by about the end of the first century after Christ.

It greatly developed under the influence of the Eastern Roman Empire. 
Indeed, Byzantine architecture influenced most of the Christian churches in lower Nubia.

The Byzantine Emperor Justinian I (reigned 527 to 565) made Nubia a stronghold of Christianity during the Middle Ages.
By 580 AD Christianity had become the official religion of the northern Sudan, centered around the Faras cathedral.

Modern missionary activity
During the 19th century, British missionaries re-introduced the Christian faith into South Sudan. British imperial authorities somewhat arbitrarily limited missionary activity to the multi-ethnic southern region. The Church of England and other parts of the Anglican Communion continued to send missionaries and other assistance after the country became independent in 1956, although that also precipitated decades of civil war and persecutions as discussed below.

At the 2011 division which split off South Sudan, over 97% of the population in Sudan in the north, adheres to Islam. Religions followed by the South Sudanese include traditional indigenous religions, Christianity and Islam. The last census to mention the religion of southerners dates back to 1956 where a majority were classified as following traditional beliefs or were Christian while 18% were Muslim. 

Scholarly and some U.S. Department of State sources state that a majority of southern Sudanese maintain traditional indigenous animist beliefs. Christianity is a minority in Sudan (albeit an influential one), which would make South Sudan one of the very few countries in the world where most people follow a traditional indigenous religion. However, according to the U.S. State Department's International Religious Freedom Report of 2012, the majority of the population adhere to Christianity, while reliable statistics on animist and Muslim belief are not available.
 
The majority of Christians in Sudan adhere either to the Roman Catholic church or to the Anglican churches (represented by the Episcopal Church of the Sudan), but there are several other small denominations represented there including: 

 Africa Inland Church
 Apostolic Church
 Coptic Orthodox Church of Alexandria
 Eritrean Orthodox Tewahedo Church
 Ethiopian Orthodox Tewahedo Church
 Greek Orthodox Church
 International church of the Nazarene
 Jehovah's Witnesses
 New Apostolic
 Presbyterian Church of the Sudan
 Seventh Day Adventist Church
 Sudan Presbyterian Evangelical Church
 Sudan Pentecostal Church
 Sudan Interior Church
 Sudan Church of Christ

Roman Catholic missionaries began work in Sudan in 1842; both Anglicans and American Presbyterians began in Sudan in 1899. The Anglicans through the Church Missionary Society had their base in Omdurman, while the Presbyterians began in Khartoum but developed ministry both in the north and in the south. The Sudan Interior Mission began working in the country in 1937. The Africa Inland Mission launched the Africa Inland Church in 1949. In 1964 all foreign missionaries were made to leave southern Sudan because of the civil war. A few groups maintained missionaries in the north. The Sudan Pentecostal Church, which has grown significantly in the south, was started later by the Swedish.

, prior to the independence of South Sudan, about 2,009,374 Sudanese practiced Roman Catholicism, mainly in the south (5% of the population were devout Roman Catholics). Nine catholic dioceses include two archdioceses in modern Sudan, with five Cathedrals. The patron saint of the Sudan is the former slave Saint Josephine Bakhita, canonized in 2000.

About 100,000 people or 0.25% of the population belong to various Protestant denominations in northern Sudan. Catholicism is practised by some thousand followers north of Sudan's capital. A 2015 study estimates some 30,000 Muslim converted to Christianity in Sudan, most of them belonging to some form of Protestantism.

In 2019, the civilian cabinet of Sudan marked Christmas as an official public holiday for the first time in 10 years since the secession of South Sudan from northern Sudan under president Omar al-Bashir.

Pope Francis Visited South Sudan in february 2023, Urged End to Ethnic Hatred. On the final day of his pilgrimage to the country, the pontiff delivered a powerful message of peace and reconciliation, calling on the people of South Sudan to lay down their weapons of hatred. The visit was well-received by the largely Christian population, who hoped for change in a country struggling with conflict and poverty.

Persecution

Sudan's Christians have been persecuted under various military regimes.  Sudan's civil wars temporarily ended in 1972, but resumed in 1983, as famine hit the region. Four million people were displaced and two million people died in the two-decade long conflict, before a temporary six-year ceasefire was signed in January 2005.

In May 1983, Sudan's Anglican and Roman Catholic clergy signed a declaration that they would not abandon God, as God had revealed himself to them under threat of Shariah Law. Anti-Christian persecutions grew particularly after 1985, including murders of pastors and church leaders, destruction of Christian villages, as well as churches, hospitals, schools and mission bases, and bombing of Sunday church services. Lands laid waste and where all buildings were demolished included an area the size of Alaska. 

Despite the persecutions, Sudanese Christians increased in number from 1.6 million in 1980 to 11 million in 2010. This was despite 22 of the 24 Anglican dioceses operating in exile in Kenya and Uganda, and clergy being unpaid. Four million people remain internally displaced, and another million are in the Sudanese diaspora abroad (of which 400,000 - 600,000 are of the South Sudanese diaspora).

In 2011, South Sudan voted to secede from the north, effective 9 July. Persecution of Christians there had resumed by then.

The Naivasha Agreement technically protects non-Muslims in the north. Some interpretations of Muslim law in Sudan refuse to recognize conversions out of Islam, considering apostacy a crime, and refuse to recognize marriages to non-Muslims. Sudan is one of the nations where being a Christian is hardest in the world. Freedom of religion and belief are systematically violated.

In 2014, there was controversy over the planned execution of Maryam Yaḥyā Ibrahīm Isḥaq for apostasy. She was later released and after further delays left Sudan.

See also 
 Early history of Sudan
 Nubia
 Josephine Bakhita
 Religion in Sudan

References

Bibliography
 Maria Alloisio. Bakhita. Editrice La Scuola. Brescia, 1970.
 
 Jakobielski, S. Christian Nubia at the Height of its Civilization (Chapter 8). UNESCO. University of California Press. San Francisco, 1992 
 Pierli, Francesco, Maria Teresa Ratti, and Andrew C. Wheeler. 1998. Gateway to the Heart of Africa: Missionary Pioneers in Sudan. Nairobi: Paulines Publications in Africa.